Northwestern Master of Product Design and Development Management (MPD²) is an educational program within the McCormick School of Engineering at Northwestern University. The MPD² program's goal is attuned to the abilities, desires and needs of humanity. Coupling their human-centered design with the practical realities of technology and organizations, the MPD² program seeks an education that leads to innovation and profitable products. The MPD² program is directed by Walter B. Herbst, Richard M Lueptow and Greg Holderfield.

History 
Northwestern University's Master of Product Design and Development Management (MPD²) product grew out of the demand for a master's program that was 1 part business, and equal parts product development and design.

Curriculum 
The MPD² Program is a 2-year program offered at Northwestern University. During the first year, student learn the basic framework for PD&D leaders, management essentials and how to manage the PD&D process. The second year students refine the process of PD&D, learn product development essentials and market integration. Classes are led by prominent practitioners and distinguished scholars. Their expertise in user research, strategy and new product development provide students with a well-rounded educational experience.

Faculty

Directors

Jim Wicks (2021 - Present)

Walter Herbst (2002 - 2021) 
Founder of Herbst LaZar Bell, Inc., Walter B Herbst had over 40 years of PD&D experience before starting the MPD² program in 2002. Herbst holds over 85 patents in hardware, housewares and medical products. Walter Herbst is mentioned in "Who's Who of American Inventors" by BusinessWeek.

Richard Lueptow 
Richard Lueptow's background is in biomedical product development.

Greg Holderfield 
Greg Holderfield's background is in design. He is the recipient of four Industrial Design Excellence Awards (IDEA) presented jointly by BusinessWeek and the Industrial Design Society of America (IDSA), including the "Gold" for Industrial Equipment Design. Holderfield also holds 21 design and utility patents. His work has been exhibited in galleries across the nation and has been published in The Wall Street Journal, BusinessWeek, Forbes and Wired.

Other prominent faculty members 
 David Austen-Smith, PhD. Senior Associate Dean, Kellogg School of Management
 Mark Dziersk, FIDSA, Vice President Industrial Design, Brandimage
 John Boyce, Adjunct Lecturer. Senior Business Consultant, Koch Industries
 Russell J. Branaghan, PhD. Visiting Professor. Director of Human Technology, Arizona State University
 Dan Brown, Adjunct Professor. President, Logger-head Tools
 Stephen H. Carr, PhD. Associate Dean for Undergraduate Engineering. 
 James G. Conley, PhD. Principal, Winnemac Consulting. 
 Phillip Corse. Adjunct Associate Professor of Marketing. CEO, Connectables. 
 Sudhakar D. Deshmukh, PhD. Charles E. Morrison Professor of Decision Sciences. Director MMM Program, Kellogg School of Management
 Thomas F. Gibbons, JD. Dean, School of Continuing Studies. Senior Lecturer, School of Law

References 

Master of Product Design and Development
Master's degrees
2005 establishments in Illinois